Saptapadii is 2013 Gujarati film produced by Amitabh Bachchan Corporation starring Manav Gohil and Swaroop Sampat in leading roles. Saptapadii is the story of a contemporary Gujarati (Indian) woman who risks her comfortably settled married life of 20 years to do what she believes in. Saptapadii had been released in theatres across India on 1 February 2013, and had a record-breaking run of 12 weeks. In addition to the financial success, the critical success is also evident from the fact that it has been selected into 7 film festivals in 5 countries, notably winning a Special Mention for the Green Rose at the Jaipur International Film Festival. It is also being described as the turning point in Gujarati Cinema.

Plot 
The story revolves around a couple Siddharth and Swati Sanghvi. Both are in their late 40s. Life takes a turn for the couple during a visit to Saputara, to celebrate their 20th anniversary, where Swati meets a 9-year-old child. Being an expert in treating traumatised kids, she recognises the symptoms in this child. Swati takes the onus of bringing the child out of trauma. Eventually it is revealed that the child is a victim of a terror attack and has lost both his parents in it. The film is about how the child changes the couple’s lives.

Cast 
Manav Gohil as Siddharth Sanghvi
Swaroop Sampat as Swati Sanghvi
Heet Samani as Mohsin
Shailee Shah as Shreya
Utkarsh Mazumdar as Dr. Patrawala
Homi Wadia as Commissioner of Police, Special Branch
Vihaan Choudhary as Rohan    
The Children of Primary School, Saputara

References

External links 
 
 

Indian drama films
Films shot in Gujarat
2013 films
2010s Gujarati-language films